Aleksander Pallas (10 September 1887 – 7 January 1939) was an Estonian lawyer and politician who was the acting deputy mayor of Tallinn from 13 November to 25 November 1917. He graduated from the Faculty of Law at Moscow State University. A lawyer in Tallinn, he worked alongside Otto Strandman as a city councilor. He participated in the Estonian War of Independence. Pallas was the first mayor after the German occupation of Estonia during World War I, serving as the acting deputy mayor for all of 12 days. Despite being temporary, the brief mayoralty set the stage for the building up of Tallinn as the capital of Estonia. He was succeeded by Aleksander Hellat.

See also
List of mayors of Tallinn

References

1887 births
1939 deaths
People from Kohila Parish
People from the Governorate of Estonia
20th-century Estonian politicians
Mayors of Tallinn
20th-century Estonian lawyers